Les grandes vacances (released internationally as The Exchange Student) is a French–Italian comedy movie from 1967, directed by Jean Girault, written by Jean Girault and starring by Louis de Funès.

Plot 
Charles Bosquier is the dictatorial headmaster of a French school. One of his own sons miserably failed his exams, so he sends him to England as exchange student.

Cast 
 Louis de Funès :  M. Charles Bosquier
 Claude Gensac : Mme Isabelle Bosquier
 Ferdy Mayne : Mac Farrell
 Martine Kelly : Shirley Mac Farrell
 Jean St Clair : Mrs Mac Farrell
 Olivier de Funès : Gérard Bosquier
 François Leccia : Philippe Bosquier
 Maurice Risch : Stéphane Michonnet
 Jean-Pierre Bertrand : Christian, a friend of Philippe
 René Bouloc : Bargin, the pupil who leaves with Philippe
 Jacques Dublin : Claude, a friend of Philippe
 Dominique Maurin : Michel, a friend of Philippe
 Bernard Le Coq : Jean-Christophe

References

External links
 

1967 films
1967 comedy films
French comedy films
Italian comedy films
1960s French-language films
Films directed by Jean Girault
1960s Italian films
1960s French films